François Besch (born 11 April 1963) is a Luxembourgish photographer and artist.

Life and work
Besch was born on 11 April 1963 in Esch-sur-Alzette. The autodidact has been living and working in Bivange since 2006.

In Besch's nature and landscape shots, his primary interest is in conveying feelings or moods. he has also made portrait, street and experimental photography since the 1980s. He uses classic cameras and also a smartphone. In 2011, Besch hosted an exhibition in Luxembourg in which the photographs were created using the Hipstamatic application for the iPhone.

In 2013 POST Luxembourg acquired five of his works—portraits of wild mushrooms—which were used on a series of postage stamps.

Besch also makes portraits of personalities using a smartphone, among them other photographers John G. Morris, Lucien Clergue and David Hamilton.

Awards 
2017: Monika von Boch-Preis für Fotografie

Exhibitions 
 2013: Von Glückspilzen und anderen Lichtwelten, Galerie Clairefontaine (Espace 2), Luxemburg
 2013: The Story of the Creative, See.Me Exhibition Space, New York City
 2014: Salon d'automne du Cercle artistique de Luxembourg
 2015: BeNeLux, Galerie bij de Boeken, Ulft, Netherlands
 2015: Six Lives in Photography, Photomeetings Luxembourg
 2016: Luxembourg Art Week 2016, Salon d'automne du Cercle artistique de Luxembourg
 2017: François Besch, Hipstamatics, Museum Schloss Fellenberg, Merzig, Germany

References

External links 
 
 

Luxembourgian artists
1963 births
Living people
Luxembourgian photographers
People from Esch-sur-Alzette